Cindy M. Bass (born November 4, 1967) is a Democratic politician and member of the City Council of Philadelphia.

Personal life
Bass grew up in North Philadelphia and graduated from Parkway-Northwest High School and Temple University. She served as chair of the Coalition of 100 Black Women, was involved with Mt. Airy USA and worked as a community loan officer. In 2005, she started the Northwest Fund, a non-profit that funds neighborhood groups.

Bass is divorced and lives with her daughter in Mount Airy.

Political career
Bass has worked as a senior policy advisor to former Congressman Chaka Fattah, and was a special assistant to Allyson Schwartz during her time in the State Senate. She has been involved in community organizing, helping marshal funds for local projects and efforts.

She has worked as a campaign manager for former Philadelphia City Council member Blondell Reynolds Brown. She also ran unsuccessfully for Pennsylvania State Senate.

She first ran for City Council's Eighth District in 2007 with the support of Chaka Fattah and the endorsement of the Philadelphia Daily News but lost to incumbent Democrat Donna Reed Miller. She placed second in a four way primary.

She ran for the Eighth District seat again in 2011 after Donna Reed Miller's retirement. In the primary she received endorsements from Michael Nutter, The Philadelphia Tribune, The Philadelphia Inquirer, Philadelphia Daily News, R. Seth Williams and others. She won the eight-way race with 39.4% of the vote.

Philadelphia City Council 
In November 2017, Bass introduced a bill that would force establishments listed as restaurants, but do not have public bathrooms or seating for 30 people, to remove the bulletproof glass that protects employees from getting shot and stabbed by their customers. This earned controversy from the store owners – most who are Korean Americans – who felt they were being "targeted".

See also
List of members of Philadelphia City Council since 1952

References

External links
Councilwoman Cindy Bass official city website
Cindy Bass for City Council official campaign website

Living people
Philadelphia City Council members
Temple University alumni
Pennsylvania Democrats
1967 births
Women city councillors in Pennsylvania
2020 United States presidential electors
21st-century American women